Jason Pociask (born February 9, 1983) is a former American football tight end in the National Football League (NFL) for the New York Jets, New England Patriots, Tampa Bay Buccaneers, Indianapolis Colts, Carolina Panthers, Seattle Seahawks and Dallas Cowboys. He was drafted by the New York Jets in the fifth round of the 2006 NFL Draft. He also was a member of the Florida Tuskers in the United Football League (UFL). He played college football at Wisconsin.

Early years
Pociask attended Plainfield High School in Plainfield, Indiana. As a senior, he tallied 47 receptions for 721 yards and 128 tackles. He contributed to a 14–1 record and an appearance in the state finals. He received Associated Press All-state and 4A Defensive Player of the Year honors.

College career
Pociask accepted a football scholarship from the University of Wisconsin. As a redshirt freshman, he appeared in 5 games as a backup tight end and playing on special teams.

As a sophomore he appeared in 13 games (5 starts), collecting one reception for 5 yards. As a junior, he appeared  in 11 contests (4 starts), making 4 receptions for 60 yards.

As a senior, he started 12 games, posting 7 receptions for 79 yards. He finished his college career with 41 games (21 starts) and 12 receptions for 144 yards.

Professional career

New York Jets
Pociask  was selected by the New York Jets in the 5th round (150th overall) of the 2006 NFL Draft. On August 5, 2006, he was placed on the injured reserve list with a season ending shoulder injury. In 2007, he appeared in 4 games as a backup tight end, making one reception for 7 yards. He was released on August 30, 2008.

New England Patriots
On September 1, 2008, he was claimed off waivers by the New England Patriots. He was released three days later on September 4.

Tampa Bay Buccaneers
On October 27, 2008, he was signed to the Tampa Bay Buccaneers practice squad. He was promoted to the active roster on December 30. He was released on September 5, 2009.

Indianapolis Colts
On September 8, 2009, he was signed to the Indianapolis Colts practice squad. He was released on September 12. He was re-signed on September 16. He was released on September 17.

Carolina Panthers
On October 27, 2009, he was signed to the Carolina Panthers practice squad. He was released on November 17.

Seattle Seahawks
On December 31, 2009, he was signed to the Seattle Seahawks practice squad. On January 5, 2010, he was promoted to the active roster for the playoffs. He was released on May 17, 2010.

Florida Tuskers (UFL)
On July 21, 2010, he signed with the Florida Tuskers of the United Football League. He registered 12 receptions for 153 yards in 9 games (6 starts). He also contributed to the team winning the UFL Championship.

Dallas Cowboys
On August 15, 2010, he was signed as a free agent by the Dallas Cowboys. He spent the final few weeks of training camp with the team before being released on September 3. He was signed to the practice squad on December 8.

References

External links
Just Sports Stats
New England Patriots bio
Seattle Seahawks bio

1983 births
Living people
American football tight ends
Carolina Panthers players
Dallas Cowboys players
Florida Tuskers players
Indianapolis Colts players
New England Patriots players
New York Jets players
People from Plainfield, Indiana
Players of American football from Indianapolis
Seattle Seahawks players
Tampa Bay Buccaneers players
Wisconsin Badgers football players